Xylophanes katharinae is a moth of the  family Sphingidae. It is known from Mexico.

It is intermediate in forewing shape between Xylophanes damocrita and Xylophanes josephinae, but distinguishable from both by the much broader pale orange median band on the hindwing upperside. The forewing apex is slightly more elongate and pointed than in Xylophanes josephinae. The hindwing apex is generally slightly exceeding the forewing tornus. The forewing upperside is similar to Xylophanes damocrita, but the second and third postmedian lines are diffuse and partially interrupted and the pale area between the third and fourth postmedian lines is twice as wide. The median band of the hindwing upperside is pale orange and twice as broad as the marginal band, the outer margin is almost even and the inner margin is prolonged along the veins as dark streaks for over half the width of the band.

Adults are probably on wing year-round.

The larvae probably feed on Rubiaceae and Malvaceae species.

References

katharinae
Moths described in 1931
Endemic Lepidoptera of Mexico